Volterra Psychiatric Hospital is a former psychiatric hospital in the city of Volterra in the Italian region of Tuscany. Founded in 1888, the hospital was known for its brutal treatment of inmates. It remained open until 1978, when it was closed following the passage of Law 180, which directed the closing down of all existing psychiatric hospitals.

The 2016 psychological horror video game The Town of Light is set in a fictionalized version of the hospital.

References 

Defunct hospitals in Italy
1888 establishments in Italy
1970s disestablishments in Italy
Buildings and structures in Volterra
Hospitals established in 1888